Hans Louis Ferdinand von Löwenstein zu Löwenstein (born 9 January 1874 in Hanover – died 14 February 1959 in Zürich) was a German mining official, politician and Reichstag delegate.

Biography 
Löwenstein was born on 9 January 1874 to Otto von Loewenstein zu Loewenstein and Emma von Dehn-Rothfelser in Hanover.

The son of an officer, he attended schools in Gießen and Marburg before studying mining science at the University of Marburg and the Clausthal University of Technology. He went to work as a referendary in 1897 before becoming an assessor in 1901, eventually becoming an important figure in the running of mines around Dortmund and ultimately nationally.

In 1908 he married Freda von Arnim-Suckow, a daughter of the military officer Theodor von Arnim-Suckow.

In 1919 Löwenstein joined the right-wing Wirtschaftsvereinigung zur Förderung der geistigen Wiederaufbaukräfte, a group that was absorbed into the German National People's Party (DNVP). He also participated in the Harzburg Front in 1931. In 1931 he joined Gesellschaft zum Studium des Faschismus, a group that linked conservatism in Germany with the Nazi Party. He also attended the Secret Meeting of 20 February 1933 when up to 25 figures from industry met Adolf Hitler to discuss financing the Nazis' election campaign.

Eventually he left the DNVP to join the Nazi Party, and was selected as one of its Reichstag candidates for the November 1933 election, remaining a member until the 1938 election when he retired.

Bibliography
Erwin Dickhoff: Essener Köpfe - wer war was?. Verlag Richard Bracht, Essen 1985 – 
Erich Stockhorst: 5000 Köpfe – Wer war was im Dritten Reich. Arndt, Kiel 2000, .

References

External links
 Reichstag profile
 Akten der Reichskanzlei profile

1874 births
1959 deaths
German mining engineers
German National People's Party politicians
Nazi Party politicians
Members of the Reichstag of Nazi Germany
Nobility in the Nazi Party
Nobility from Hanover
Engineers from Hanover
20th-century German engineers
Politicians from Hanover
Clausthal University of Technology alumni